Okrika is an island in Rivers State, Nigeria, capital of the Local Government Area of the same name. The town is situated on an island south of Port Harcourt, making it a suburb of the much larger city.

The average elevation of Okrika is 452 metres. It lies on the north of the Bonny River and on Okrika Island, 35 miles (56 km) upstream from the Bight of Bonny. The town can be reached by vessels of a draft of 29 feet (9 metres) or less.

Formerly a fishing village of the Ijo (Ijaw) people in the mangrove swamps of the eastern Niger River(Delta), Okrika became the capital of the Okrika kingdom in the early 17th century and actively dealt in slaves. It served as a port for the exportation of palm oil after the abolition of the slave trade in the 1830s, but it was a less significant port facility than either Bonny (18 miles [46 km] south) or Opobo (32 miles [81 km] east-southeast). By 1912, Okrika had been completely eclipsed by Port Harcourt, and it was not revived as a commercial town until 1965, when the nearby Port Harcourt refinery was completed and pipelines were built to a jetty on Okrika Mainland. It also has a major gas plant facility (Alakiri gas plant) that supplies to the refinery and others.

Refined petroleum products are some of Okrika's significant exports. The town has considerable local trade in fish( which is in rapid decline due to pollution of the waters and land by crude oil activities) oil palm produce, locally processed salt, cassava (manioc), taro, plantains, and yams.

The 2006 census determined the population of the Wakirike Local Government Area of the Rivers State of Nigeria was 222,026. An estimated 145,000 Okrika natives live elsewhere around the world, mostly in the United Kingdom and the United States.

Socio-cultural organisation
Nine traditional towns constituted the Okrika Kingdom before 1913, these towns are Kirike, Ogoloma, Ogu, Bolo, Ogbogbo, Ibaka, Ele, Isaka and Abuloma. Most of these traditional towns also have satellite villages. Today the constituent towns of Okrika kingdom has increased to ten towns.  The additional town is Koniju Town (Koni-ama). Wakirikese is a collective name for Okrika villages even before the British Colonial Government began its colonial expedition.

FESTIVALS

Iria Festival: The Iria festival dates back to the 16th century; an annual ceremony of womanhood that is held at a market square in Okrika, an ancient town in Rivers State, Nigeria. Breasts-baring maidens are seen being initiated by the people into womanhood. Virgins are presented and kept in the fattening room, where they are taken care of for the festival

List of towns and villages in Wakirike Kingdom 

 Abam
 Abiobo
 Amadi
 Agbkien
 Andi-kiri
 Asemeningolike
 Dan-kiri
 Dikibo
 Ekerekana
 George
 Ibaka
 Ibuluya/Dikibo
 Ikiriko 
 Ikpo-kiri
 Iyo-kiri 
 Kalio
 Mbi-kiri
 Ndubusi
 Ngbagbeboko
 Ngolo
 Oba
 Obianime
 Odokorobie
 Ogan
 Ogbogbo
 Ogoloma
 Ojimba
 Okochiri
 Okujagu
 Okumgba
 Okuru
 Omoaobi
 Omodere
 Opuada
 Otobipi
 Owuogono
 Ozuboko
 Sara
 Semembiri
 Tere
 Teriapu-Kiri
 Wakama

House system
The Okrikans like all other Ijo sub-groups of the Niger Delta are organised into autonomous and co-equal War-Canoe houses (Omuaru-wari). Kinsmen living together in the same area make up each War-Canoe House. Although the War-Canoe is an institution of kinship, historically, it deals principally with war and defence. War-Canoe houses may be different in terms of size and man power, however. Benefits and community assets are shared to the War-Canoe houses equally and not based on their numerical strength. Every War-Canoe House is headed by a Chief who is assisted in various capacities by sub-chiefs. The Chief is addressed as the 'Warinyanabo' or 'Waridabo' showing his status as head of the entire War-Canoe house (Omuaru-wari). Each War-Canoe house also known as Omuaru-wari or Warinyengi is constituted by sub-units known variously as 'Warikubu' or 'Oko'. Each sub-unit (Warikubu or Oko) is headed by a sub-chief known locally as the 'Oko-tibidabo'. Each sub-unit (Warikubu or Oko) is further divided into extended family units known as 'Furo'. Characterised by strong kinship ties, the Furo is composed of grandfathers, parents, uncles, aunts, brothers, sisters, cousins, nephews and nieces.

Class System: Within each War-Canoe house, there are four classes for men and three for women. Classes are referred to as 'Mumbu'.  Male members of the War-Canoe house apart from the Chief and the King (Amayanabo) are classed into 'Opu Mumbu' (first class), 'Ogbobiri Mumbu' (second Class), 'Kala Mumbu' (third class) and 'Owuapu-awo' (teenagers below 18 years of age). Similarly, females members of a War-Canoe house are classed into the 'Opu Mumbu' (first class), 'Kala Mumbu' (second class) and 'Iria-Soka Awo' (Maidens). The class system is an ordinary ranking system, however it ensures hard work and progress within the War-Canoe House.  Ranking is usually based on age and achievements. However, the main factors that determines promotion to a given class may vary between War-Canoe Houses. As opposed to a Caste system, classes are not heritable nor transferable. Therefore, no member of the War-Canoe house is born into a class. Members higher up the class have a greater share of the benefits and financial burdens of the War-Canoe House but decision making within the War-Canoe house is democratic.

Language
The language spoken by Okrika people is Okrika-kirirke okwei, a type of Ijaw Language.

Religion
Historically, the Okrika people of old were polytheist believing in several gods and deities. Others where animist who believed in many spirits including marine spirits and in the spirits of their ancestors. Finibeso was considered the chief god of the ancient Okrika people and his priest where most reverend among other priests.  The Fenibeso shrine was most sacred and divine. Traditionally, no restrictions were imposed on the worship of any god.

In modern Okrika, Christian religion has emerged as the dominant religion and the St. Peters Cathedral is the most prominent religious building in Okrika. Traditional religion however still exists side by side with Christianity.

There are several Christian denominations in Okrika today. Some of the Christian denominations in Okrika are as follows:

The Anglican Church, the first African Church (FAC), the Roman Catholic Church, the Christ Army Church (CAC), the assemblies of God Church
the redeemed Christian church of God, Three Cross, Apostolic Church, Deeper Life, Seventh-Day Adventist Church, Greater Evangelism, El Shaidai Bible Church, Church Of God Mission
Living Faith Church(Winners Chapel), Christ Embassy, Cherubim and Seraphim, Salvation Ministries etc.

Government

Okrika Local Government Area has its headquarters located in Okrika town with the districts of Kallo, Ogoloma, Okrika and Ogan. A Chief is the head of a War Canoe House; for example the Orufingbe War Canoe house of a Ngeme Biri and a War Canoe house is made you of Furos (Families).

Economic
Okrika LGA is rich in deposits of crude oil and natural gas with the activities of oil mining and refining companies contributing immensely to the economy of the area. Also Fishing is another popular economic activity engaged in the by the Okrika people as with the area's many rivers and tributaries making them being rich in sea food. Farming is another occupation that the Okrika people are known for with the cultivation of several crops which include cassava, oil palm, yam, and plantain.

Before the onset of oil and gas activities, the Okrika people were and are still known for fishing, farming and trading; these economic activities sustain their livelihood.

Environmental problems
The Okrika kingdom is faced with a serious threat of Environmental pollution that is causing unmitigated disaster to the land of Okrika local government area of Rivers state. The daily outcry or agony of the Okrika people is that they are in the grip of death and short life span as a result. Their aquatic foods such as fresh water fishes, periwinkles and oysters are going into extinction because of oil-related chemicals from the Port – Harcourt Refinery. Air pollution is another hazard in the area as it is caused by the flaring of gas in the oil and gas refinery which could cause large quantity in greenhouse warming of gases that could lead to acidic rain and ozone layer depletion, meanwhile the men production capabilities are weakened by this activity. Also the Okrika kingdom aquatic life suffers greater threat of species extinction due to the continuous spill of oil mostly caused by bunkering and pipeline vandalism in the region and this results to poor economic sustainability as a large number of residents and indigenes are Fishermen.
The aquatic life suffers firstly from the emanation of oil waste product that comes from the refinery. It has been on a continuous spill that goes straight into the river and it has been spilling long before there was any bunkering or oil vandalism.

As of March 2017, residents have complained of soot in the air due to the destruction of makeshift illegal refineries that have sprouted all over the state.

References 

 Dr. Alfred S. Abam (Ado ix), 2012. The Customs and Tradition of The Okrika People
 Dr. Alfred S. Abam (Ado ix), 2006. The Tradition of Succession And its Implication For Peace

Towns in Rivers State
Local Government Areas in Rivers State
Port cities and towns in Nigeria